Regimental quartermaster sergeant (RQMS) is a military rank in some militaries, and an appointment in others.

Irish Defence Forces

Battalion quartermaster sergeant (BQMS, ceathrúsháirsint cathláin in Irish) is a rank in the Irish Army and Irish Air Corps equivalent to warrant officer class 2 (NATO OR-8) in the British Army. The equivalent in the Artillery Corps and Army Ranger Wing is regimental quartermaster sergeant (RQMS).

Singapore
Like the UK example, the regimental quartermaster sergeant is an appointment in a battalion-sized unit usually held by a second warrant officer. He is the senior assistant to the quartermaster, who may be a more senior warrant officer for non-combat units.

United Kingdom
Regimental quartermaster sergeant is an appointment held by a warrant officer class 2 in the British Army and Royal Marines. The RQMS is the senior assistant to the quartermaster of a regiment or battalion and also usually functions as the deputy regimental sergeant major. Some units have more than one. RQMS was a separate rank until 1915, when it became a warrant officer appointment with the creation of the rank of warrant officer class II.

In the Household Cavalry, the appointment is instead regimental quartermaster corporal.

United States
Regimental quartermaster sergeant as well as battalion quartermaster sergeant were ranks in the U.S. Army during World War I. They were redesignated regimental and battalion supply sergeants on 3 June 1916.

References

Military ranks of the Commonwealth
Military appointments of Australia
Military appointments of Canada
Military ranks of Ireland
Quartermasters
Military appointments of the British Army
Military appointments of the Royal Marines
Military ranks of the British Army
Warrant officers